Friedrich Suhr (6 May 1907 – 31 May 1946) was a German lawyer and SS-Obersturmbannführer. He worked in the Reich Security Main Office under Adolf Eichmann. During the Second World War, he led Einsatzkommando death squads in  Ukraine. He also served as the SiPo and SD commander in occupied France and was the SS and Police Leader in Oberelsaß (Upper Alsace). After the war, he committed suicide while in Allied custody.

Early life 
Suhr was born in Lüneburg and pursued a legal career at the University of Göttingen and the University of Freiburg, receiving a Doctor of Law degree. He joined the SS (membership number 65,824) on 1 February 1933, and the Nazi Party on 1 May 1933 (member number 2,623,241). He practiced law and, after the Nazi seizure of power, he was made a Government Counselor (Regierungsrat).

Work in the SS legal bureaucracy 
Suhr was commissioned an SS-Hauptsturmführer in the Sicherheitspolizei (Security Police, or SiPo) on 9 November 1938. He served as a legal consultant to the SiPo Commandant in Prague from July 1939 to May 1940, being promoted to SS-Sturmbannführer on 10 September 1939. He then was posted to SS-Obergruppenführer Reinhard Heydrich's Reich Security Main Office (RSHA) at SS headquarters in Berlin. Working in its Organization, Administration, and Law Office (Amt II), Suhr headed Section II 3A (Judicial Affairs and Damage Claims). From July 1941 to November 1942, Suhr was transferred to the Gestapo Office (Amt IV). Here, he was assigned to the legal matters section in SS-Obersturmbannführer Adolf Eichmann's Referat IV B4. (Jewish Affairs and Deportations). Suhr worked on issues related to the confiscation and sale of property expropriated from Jewish deportees. The following illustrates his actions in this regard:

On November 25, 1941, the Eleventh Ordinance of the Reich Citizenship Law was promulgated. It stated that Jews leaving Germany were to be stripped of their citizenship and their property transferred to the Reich ...  On December 3, 1941, Suhr signed a circular referring to this question that was forwarded to all RSHA stations. He explained that the operations would be financed by a special "W" bank account (a so-called W-Sonderkonto), and it was necessary to verify that every Jew would contribute at least one-quarter of all assets to this account ... At the end of February 1942, Suhr signed an additional circular on assets ... the circular's purpose was to reiterate and make doubly sure that all Jewish assets would be seized before expulsion. All Jews were obliged to complete with care a standard assets’ declaration to cover all possessions except for the small amount of property the deportee would take with him or her at departure. ... Every Jew was to take along ℛℳ 50 – no more, no less. If an indigent Jew did not have this amount at his or her disposal, it was to be collected from another, more affluent deportee. According to the Eleventh Ordinance, Jews were stripped of their citizenship as soon as they crossed over the border; their assets then passed to the hands of the Reich.

After the Wannsee Conference of 20 January 1942 that planned the implementation of the Final Solution, Suhr took part in a follow-up meeting held at the Reich Ministry for the Occupied Eastern Territories on 29 January. This meeting defined who would be considered a Jew for deportation to the extermination camps in the eastern occupied territories where they would be murdered. It was decided that Jews married to non-Jews would be included in the category for deportation, along with the children of such mixed marriages.

Second World War and the Holocaust 
In November 1942, Suhr was transferred to Einsatzgruppe C, which was attached to Army Group South operating in northern Ukraine. He was made the commander of SS-Sonderkommando 4b. Suhr headed this unit until 5 August 1943 and then took over Einsatzkommando 6 until November 1943. These were special death squads whose function was to exterminate Jews, political commissars, members of the NKVD, Soviet partisans and any other so-called "undesirable elements." These two units were estimated to have murdered a total of 6,329 persons and 5,577 persons, respectively, during their campaigns.

In December 1943, Suhr left Ukraine for Paris and was appointed Befehlshaber (Commander) of the SD and the SiPo, which included the Gestapo, for all of occupied France. He subsequently was promoted to SS-Obersturmbannführer on 20 April 1944. His duties involved anti-partisan warfare and fighting the French Resistance. He led the eponymous Kampfgruppe (Combat Group) "Suhr" and was awarded the Knight's Cross of the Iron Cross for valor on 11 December 1944. On 1 December 1944, he was named SS and Police Leader (SSPF) "Oberelsaß" (Upper Alsace). In this post, Suhr commanded all SS personnel and police in his jurisdiction, not only the SiPo and SD, but also the Ordnungspolizei (Orpo; regular uniformed police). He remained in that position until the area was overrun by American and Free French forces in early February 1945. After the end of the war in Europe, Suhr was arrested and interned. He killed himself on 31 May 1946 in the prison at Wuppertal.

SS ranks

See also 
The Holocaust in Ukraine

References

Sources 

1907 births
1946 deaths
1946 suicides
Einsatzgruppen personnel
Holocaust perpetrators in France
Holocaust perpetrators in Germany
Holocaust perpetrators in Ukraine
Lawyers in the Nazi Party
Nazis who committed suicide in Germany
Nazis who committed suicide in prison custody
Prisoners who died in British military detention
People from Lüneburg
Recipients of the Iron Cross (1939), 1st class
Recipients of the Iron Cross (1939), 2nd class
Recipients of the Knight's Cross of the Iron Cross
Recipients of the War Merit Cross
Reich Security Main Office personnel
SS and Police Leaders
SS-Brigadeführer
University of Freiburg alumni
University of Göttingen alumni
Military personnel from Lower Saxony